Marianne Krogness (born 3 November 1951) is a Norwegian actress, singer and revue artist. While a student at the University of Oslo, she joined the musical- and theatre group Tramteateret in 1976. Krogness has had several roles in television and on film, such as the 1985 drama Adjø solidaritet and the 1996–97 sitcom Bot og bedring. She has also been associated with a series of commercials she did for Shell gas stations.

Select filmography

References

External links

Interview from Dagbladet.

1951 births
Living people
Norwegian film actresses
Norwegian women singers
Norwegian television actresses